Unplugged Tour is an upcoming concert tour by Colombian singer-songwriter Juanes. It will be the longest tour of his career. It's expected for the tour to reach the Americas, Europe, Asia, Africa and Oceania.

Commercial performance
In Perú, more than 20,000 people attended to his concert in Lima. During his show in Cuzco more than 40,000 people attended to the concert making it the biggest crowd ever in that city for a concert. In Colombia, tickets sold-out for both shows in Medellin and the show in Bogotá. Later, tickets for shows in Bucaramanga, Cali and Barranquilla also sold out.

Tour dates

References

External links

Juanes concert tours
2012 concert tours